Ab Difeh (also Romanized as Āb Dīfeh) is a village in Kakasharaf Rural District, in the Central District of Khorramabad County, Lorestan Province, Iran. At the 2006 census, its population was 125, in 27 families.

References 

Towns and villages in Khorramabad County